Adolf Anton Wilhelm Wohlbrück (19 November 18969 August 1967) was an Austrian actor who settled in the United Kingdom under the name Anton Walbrook. A popular performer in Austria and pre-war Germany, he left in 1936 out of concerns for his own safety and established a career in British cinema. Walbrook is perhaps best known for his roles in the original British film of Gaslight, The Life and Death of Colonel Blimp and The Red Shoes.

Early life
Walbrook was born in Vienna, Austria, as Adolf Wohlbrück. He was the son of Gisela Rosa (Cohn) and Adolf Ferdinand Bernhard Hermann Wohlbrück. He was descended from ten generations of actors, though his father broke with tradition and was a circus clown.

Career
Walbrook studied with the director Max Reinhardt and built up a career in Austrian theatre and cinema.

In 1936, he went to Hollywood to reshoot dialogue for the 1937 multinational The Soldier and the Lady and changed his name from Adolf to Anton. Rather than returning to Germany, where he risked persecution because he was a "Mischling ersten Grades" (mixed race in the first degree) under the Nuremberg Laws as his mother was Jewish and because he was homosexual, he settled in England where he continued working as an actor, making a speciality of playing continental Europeans.

He played Otto in the first London production of Design for Living at the Haymarket Theatre in January 1939 (later transferring to the Savoy Theatre), and running for 233 performances, opposite Diana Wynyard as Gilda and Rex Harrison as Leo. In 1952 he appeared at the Coliseum as Cosmo Constantine in Call Me Madam, also participating alongside Billie Worth, Jeff Warren and Shani Wallis on the EMI cast record.

Producer-director Herbert Wilcox cast him as Prince Albert in Victoria the Great (1937). Walbrook also appeared in the sequel, Sixty Glorious Years the following year. He was in director Thorold Dickinson's version of Gaslight (1940), in the role played by Charles Boyer in the later Hollywood remake. In Dangerous Moonlight (1941), a romantic melodrama, he was a Polish pianist torn over whether to return home. For the Powell and Pressburger team in The Life and Death of Colonel Blimp (1943) he played the role of the dashing, intense "good German" officer Theo Kretschmar-Schuldorff, and the tyrannical impresario Lermontov in The Red Shoes (1948). One of his most unusual films, reuniting him with Dickinson, is The Queen of Spades (1949), a Gothic thriller based on the Alexander Pushkin short story, in which he co-starred with Edith Evans. For Max Ophüls he was the ringmaster in La Ronde (1950) and Ludwig I, King of Bavaria in Lola Montès.

His Red Shoes co-star Moira Shearer recalled Walbrook was a loner on set, often wearing dark glasses, as in his character costume in the film, and eating alone. He retired from films in 1958, and in later years appeared on the German stage and television.

Death
Walbrook died of a heart attack in the Garatshausen section of Feldafing, Bavaria, Germany in 1967. His ashes were interred in the churchyard of St. John's Church, Hampstead, London, as he had wished in his testament.

Filmography

Television (West Germany)

See also

References

Citations

General sources 
 Moor, Andrew, Dangerous Limelight: Anton Walbrook and the Seduction of the English (2001)
 Anton Walbrook. A Life of Masks and Mirrors by James Downs (Oxford: Peter Lang, 2020)

External links
 
 . Biography & filmography
 Photographs of Anton Walbrook

1896 births
1967 deaths
20th-century Austrian male actors
20th-century British male actors
Austrian emigrants to the United Kingdom
Austrian expatriates in Germany
Austrian male film actors
Austrian male silent film actors
Austrian people of Jewish descent
British male film actors
British male silent film actors
Burials at St John-at-Hampstead
British gay actors
Jews who immigrated to the United Kingdom to escape Nazism
Austrian LGBT actors
Male actors from Vienna
20th-century LGBT people